Phú Tân is a rural district of Cà Mau province in the Mekong Delta region of Vietnam. As of 2003 the district had a population of 111,791. The district covers an area of 426 km². The district capital lies at Cái Đôi Vàm.

Phú Tân was created via government decree no. 138/2003/NĐ-CP on November 17, 2003, after being split off from Cái Nước district. Phú Tân borders Cái Nước district to the east, ocean to the west, Năm Căn district to the south and Trần Văn Thời district to the north. At the time of its creation, it spanned 446 km² and had a population of 109,642.

Divisions
The district is subdivided into 9 commune-level subdivisions, including the township of Cái Đôi Vàm and the rural communes of: Phú Mỹ, Phú Tân, Phú Thuận, Rạch Chèo, Tân Hải, Việt Thắng, Tân Hưng Tây and Nguyễn Việt Khái.

References

Districts of Cà Mau province